The municipality ( or concelho) is the second-level administrative subdivision of Portugal, as defined by the 1976 Constitution.

As a general rule, each municipality is further subdivided into parishes (freguesias); the municipalities in the north of the country usually have a higher number of parishes. Six municipalities are composed of only one parish, and Barcelos, with 61 parishes, has the most. Corvo is, by law, the only municipality with no parishes.

Since the creation of a democratic local administration, in 1976, the Portuguese municipalities have been ruled by a system composed of an executive body (the municipal chamber) and a deliberative body (the municipal assembly). The municipal chamber is the executive body and is composed of the president of the municipality and a number of councillors proportional to the municipality's population. The municipal assembly is composed of the presidents of all the parishes that compose the municipality, as well as by a number of directly elected deputies, at least equal to the number of parish presidents plus one. Both bodies are elected for four years.

Portugal has an entirely separate system of cities and towns. Cities and towns are located in municipalities but often do not have the same boundaries, even they are continuously built up. There are around twice as many cities and towns as there are municipalities.

History
The municipality has been the most stable subdivision of Portugal since the foundation of the country in the 12th century. They have their origin in the foral, a legal document, issued by the King of Portugal, which assigned privileges to a town or a region. The present subdivisions have their origins in the 19th century after the administrative reforms conducted by the middle of the 19th century by the governments of the constitutional monarchy.

The concelhos probably formed after the expulsion of the Visigothic rulers by the Moors during the Umayyad conquest of Hispania. Towns were thus left free to govern themselves, and the population started to organize in councils (concelhos in Portuguese) in order to govern the town and surrounding lands. These were also a reminder of Roman municipalities.

The existence since the Middle Ages of a large number of small municipalities with no financial resources and without people qualified to take part in municipal councils caused the stagnation of their growth. The Liberal revolution of 1836, resulted in the suppression/annexation of many of these smaller municipalities, which allowed the infusion of new revenues and facilitated growth in population and size.

Geography

There are 308 municipalities in Portugal: 278 in mainland Portugal, 19 in the autonomous region of the Azores, and 11 in Madeira. They are usually named for their biggest city, or at least, their historically most important city or town. However, the municipality is not synonymous with the city (or urban centre) and can include various towns or cities. In Portugal, cities/towns are a social distinction based on population size and associated services and have no legal representation in law or constitution. 

Portugal has no unincorporated areas; all the national territory belongs to a municipality, including uninhabited islands: Berlengas to Peniche, Desertas Islands to Santa Cruz, Selvagens Islands to Funchal, and Formigas Islets to Vila do Porto.

Portugal is divided into 18 continental districts and two autonomous regions, Azores and Madeira. The table below is the distribution of the municipalities within these districts and the autonomous regions:

The biggest municipalities are those located in rural and inland areas where the dominating property type is the latifundia, such as Beja, Évora, or Portalegre in the south, and also in other less populated areas, such as Bragança or Castelo Branco.

The most populous municipalities are those located near the sea, and especially around the metropolitan areas of Lisbon, Porto, and Braga, while the less populous municipalities are located in the inland regions of Alentejo and Trás-os-Montes. The municipalities with the lowest population densities are also found in these inland regions, with smaller populations distributed over a greater area.

Demographics
This chart gives the number of inhabitants in the municipality area and the area is in km2 (only for populations over 100,000). Around 190 municipalities have less than 20,000 inhabitants (2022) each.

See also

 List of municipalities of Portugal
 Municipality
 Subdivisions of Portugal

References

 
Subdivisions of Portugal
Portugal 2
Municipalities, Portugal